The 2018 NWHL Draft took place on the 19th and 20 December 2018, the first and only draft in NWHL history to happen while the season was underway. The expansion Minnesota Whitecaps would take part in the draft for the first time.

A total of 30 players were drafted, of which twenty were American, four were Canadian, and one was Swedish. Four players were drafted from Boston College, along with three each from Merrimack College, Colgate University, and the University of Wisconsin–Madison.

The 2018 draft was the first draft in NWHL history not to see a goaltender selected in the first two rounds, and the first to see an NCAA Division III player selected.

Format 
There was five rounds, with each team having one pick in each and having 90 seconds to make that pick. Draft order was decided using each team's winning percentage in the first half of the season, with goal difference being the tiebreaker. The final draft order was:
 Metropolitan Riveters
 Connecticut Whale
 Buffalo Beauts
 Minnesota Whitecaps
 Boston Pride

Players who were drafted were not guaranteed to sign with the team that drafted them.

Results

References 

Premier Hockey Federation